Caleb Shepherd (born 29 June 1993) is a New Zealand rowing cox. He holds the world best time in the men's coxed pair (2014) and represented at the Rio Olympics in the New Zealand eight. He coxed the New Zealand women's eight to their 2019 World Championship title and has been twice a world champion.

Private life
Shepherd was born in 1993 and is from Huntly. He received his secondary education at Hamilton Boys' High School as a boarder where he started coxing in 2006. Shepherd completed a master's degree at the University of Waikato in 2020, with a thesis on depression in autobiographical sports writing. Shepherd wants to become a sports journalist.

Of Māori descent, Shepherd affiliates to the Ngāti Porou iwi.

Rowing
At the 2011 World Rowing Junior Championships at Dorney Lake, Dorney, England, Shepherd won silver with the junior men's coxed four. At the 2012 World Rowing U23 Championships at Trakai in Lithuania, Shepherd won bronze with the U23 men's coxed four. At the 2013 World Rowing U23 Championships at Linz-Ottensheim in Austria, he won gold with the men's eight. A year later at the July 2014 World Rowing U23 Championships in Varese, Italy, he won another gold with the same boat. On 29 August 2014, Shepherd was the cox for Hamish Bond and Eric Murray when they set the world best time in the men's coxed pair at the 2014 World Rowing Championships at Bosbaan, Amsterdam in the final race, thus winning gold. As of 2021 that time still stood as the world's best. He came fourth at the 2015 World Rowing Championships with the men's eight, qualifying the boat for the 2016 Olympics. This is the first time that a New Zealand eight qualified for the Olympics since 1984, despite the famous performance of past eights including the 1982 New Zealand eight. He came sixth with his team at the eights competition in Rio de Janeiro.

References

External links

1993 births
Living people
New Zealand male rowers
World Rowing Championships medalists for New Zealand
People educated at Hamilton Boys' High School
Sportspeople from Huntly, New Zealand
Olympic rowers of New Zealand
Rowers at the 2016 Summer Olympics
Ngāti Porou people
Coxswains (rowing)
Rowers at the 2020 Summer Olympics
Medalists at the 2020 Summer Olympics
Olympic medalists in rowing
Olympic silver medalists for New Zealand
University of Waikato alumni